Marry Me, Cherie is a 1964 German-Austrian comedy film directed by Axel von Ambesser and starring Paul Hubschmid, Letícia Román and Ann Smyrner. It is based on a novel by Gábor Vaszary.

Cast
 Paul Hubschmid as Andreas
 Letícia Román as Christine
 Ann Smyrner as Marianne
 Peter Weck as Georg
 Adeline Wagner as Susanne
 Fritz Muliar
 Helli Servi
 Lotte Lang
 Hugo Gottschlich

References

External links
 

1964 films
1964 comedy films
German comedy films
Austrian comedy films
West German films
1960s German-language films
Films directed by Axel von Ambesser
Films based on Hungarian novels
1960s German films